William Francis O'Donnell (died 4 February 1947) was an Irish politician who served for four years in Dáil Éireann.

He was first elected to the Dáil as a Clann na Talmhan Teachta Dála (TD) for the Tipperary constituency at the 1943 general election. He was re-elected at the 1944 general election, but died in 1947. After his death, the by-election for his Dáil seat was won on 29 October 1947 by the Clann na Poblachta candidate, Patrick Kinane.

References

1947 deaths
Members of the 11th Dáil
Members of the 12th Dáil
Clann na Talmhan TDs
Irish farmers
1878 births